Ashraf Darreh (also known as Ashrafdāl) is a village in Gholaman Rural District, Raz and Jargalan District, Bojnord County, North Khorasan Province, Iran. At the 2006 census, its population was 1,265, in 294 families.

References 

Populated places in Bojnord County